Wizards & Warriors is a 1987 game from Rare Ltd.

Wizards and Warriors may also refer to:
 Wizards & Warriors II, sequel to first game
 Wizards & Warriors III third entry in the series
 Wizards & Warriors X: The Fortress of Fear a Game Boy entry in the Wizards & Warriors series
 Wizards and Warriors (TV series)
 Wizards & Warriors (2000 video game) a role-playing video game for Microsoft Windows

See also
Flashing Swords! 3: Warriors and Wizards, a 1976 fantasy anthology